Breaking Through (also known as Breaking Dance in Europe) is a 2015 American-English dance drama film written and directed by John Swetnam and starring Sophia Aguiar.

Plot
Casey is an dancer who creates a Youtube channel to publishes dancing videos and tutorials, becoming a big hit in a short time. The girl is introduced in the rich and famous world, but fame comes at a price and she will no longer be able to trust her own friends, like the jealous Roseli.

Cast
Sophia Aguiar as Casey McNamara
Robert Roldan as Drew
Bruna Marquezine as Roseli
Jordan Rodrigues as J.J.
Julie Warner as Anna
Shaun Brown as Phillip 
Les Twins as Larry and Laurent Jordan
Lindsey Stirling as Phelba
Taeko McCarroll as Michelle
Jay Ellis as Quinn
Taylor Locascio as Megan
McCarrie McCausland as Nick
Marissa Heart as Tara
Marcus Emanuel Mitchell as Bryson Chase
Anitta as herself

Reception
Breaking Through received mostly negative reviews. Justin Lowe of The Hollywood Reporter called it derivative. Tat Wolfen from Saturday Star wrote that it was "yet another dance movie that has nothing new to offer". Katie Walsh of the Los Angeles Times  called it "a dance movie without good dancing". Monica Castillo writing in The Village Voice said it was "convoluted drama" and had " tepid routines". David Noh of Film Journal International thought it "could well rank as the blandest movie musical ever made." On the positive side Sandie Angulo Chen of Common Sense Media gave it three stars, saying the story was "both familiar and heartwarming".

References

External links
 

2015 films
2015 drama films
American drama films
American dance films
Films shot in California
Films shot in Los Angeles
American independent films
2015 directorial debut films
2015 independent films
2010s English-language films
2010s American films